Joel Baillargeon (October 6, 1964 – August 26, 2022) was a Canadian ice hockey player. 

Baillargeon was born in Charlesbourg, Quebec. As a youth, he played in the 1976 and 1977 Quebec International Pee-Wee Hockey Tournaments with a minor ice hockey team from Charlesbourg. He later played as a left winger in parts of three seasons for the Winnipeg Jets and Quebec Nordiques in the National Hockey League. He died in 2022 at the age of 57.

Career statistics

Regular season and playoffs

References

External links

1964 births
2022 deaths
French Quebecers
Canadian ice hockey left wingers
Chicoutimi Saguenéens (QMJHL) players
Fort Wayne Komets players
Granby Bisons players
Halifax Citadels players
Hull Olympiques players
Ice hockey people from Quebec City
Moncton Hawks players
Sherbrooke Canadiens players
Sherbrooke Jets players
Quebec Nordiques players
Trois-Rivières Draveurs players
Winnipeg Jets (1979–1996) draft picks
Winnipeg Jets (1979–1996) players